Peter Quinn may refer to:

Sports
Peter Quinn (footballer) (1892–1976), English footballer
Peter Quinn (forward), English footballer
Peter Quinn (Gaelic footballer) (1925–2016), Irish Gaelic footballer
Peter Quinn (sports administrator), served as President of the Gaelic Athletic Association from 1991 until 1994

Other people
Peter Quinn (admiral), Australian naval officer
Peter Quinn (astronomer) (born 1955), head of the Data Management Division at the European Southern Observatory
Peter Quinn (bishop) (1928–2008), Australian bishop
Peter Quinn (MP), Irish Conservative Party Member of the Parliament of the United Kingdom
Peter Quinn (radio presenter), British radio presenter
Peter A. Quinn (1904–1974), U.S. Congressman
Peter H. Quinn (1873–1931), U.S. soldier
Peter J. Quinn, information technology worker
Peter Quinn (Homeland), character in Homeland TV series